Mount Saint John is an unincorporated community located in Greene County, Ohio, United States.

References

	

Unincorporated communities in Greene County, Ohio
Unincorporated communities in Ohio